Lee Filipovski is a Serbian-Canadian film director and screenwriter. Filipovski is most noted for her 2016 short film Fluffy (Flafi), which won the Canadian Screen Award for Best Live Action Short Film at the 6th Canadian Screen Awards. and the Hollywood Foreign Press Association Award for Best Short Film in 2017.

Her newest short film, Zero (Nula), premiered at the 2021 Toronto International Film Festival.

References

External links

1989 births
Living people
Canadian women film directors
Directors of Genie and Canadian Screen Award winners for Best Live Action Short Drama
Film directors from Ontario
Serbian emigrants to Canada